Paweł Komorowski (14 August 1930 – 28 November 2011) was a Polish film director and screenwriter. He directed twenty films between 1955 and 2000.

Selected filmography
 Pięciu (1964)

References

External links

1930 births
2011 deaths
Polish film directors
Polish screenwriters
Film people from Warsaw